The 312th Tactical Fighter Training Squadron is an inactive United States Air Force unit.  Its last assignment was with the 58th Tactical Training Wing at Luke Air Force Base, Arizona, where it was inactivated on 18 January 1991.  Upon inactivation, the squadron's personnel, equipment and aircraft were transferred to the 311th Fighter Squadron.

The squadron was first activated during World War II and served as a fighter replacement training unit until it was disbanded in 1944 in a reorganization of Army Air Forces training units.  It was reconstituted and activated once again in 1984.

History

World War II

The squadron was activated as part of the 338th Fighter Group at Dale Mabry Field, Florida in July 1942. The 312th initially flew the Bell P-39 Airacobra.

The squadron's mission was to act as a Replacement Training Unit (RTU).  RTUs were oversized units that trained individual pilots or aircrews following their graduation from flight school. In June 1943, the 338th Group began a split organization and the 312th and 441st Fighter Squadrons moved to Perry Army Air Field, Florida, while group headquarters and the other two squadrons remained at Dale Mabry Field. After September 1943, the group focused on Republic P-47 Thunderbolt training, although the squadron had some P-40s in 1944.

However, the Army Air Forces was finding that standard military units, based on relatively inflexible tables of organization were not proving well adapted to the training mission.  Accordingly, it adopted a more functional system for its training bases in which each base was organized into a separate numbered unit.
The squadron was disbanded in May 1944, and its personnel, equipment and mission transferred to the 342d AAF Base Unit (Replacement Training Unit, Fighter).

Tactical Air Command

The 312th was reconstituted, designated the 312th Tactical Fighter Training Squadron and reactivated by Tactical Air Command at Luke Air Force Base, Arizona in October 1984 as the first General Dynamics F-16C Fighting Falcon training squadron in the USAF.  The squadron once again acted as a replacement training unit.  It was initially equipped with new Block 25 Fighting Falcons, but it converted to new Block 42 planes in 1990.  Its aircraft carried "LF" tail code with a black tail stripe outlined in red. It was inactivated in 1991 and most of its aircraft reassigned to 308th, 309th and 310th Fighter Squadrons.

Lineage
 Constituted as the 312th Fighter Squadron on 16 Ju1y 1942
 Activated on 22 Ju1y 1942
 Disbanded on 1 May 1944
 Reconstituted and redesignated 312th Tactical Fighter Training Squadron on 1 October 1984
 Activated 1 October 1984
 Inactivated on 18 January 1991

Assignments
 338th Fighter Group, 22 July 1942 – 1 May 1944
 58th Tactical Training Wing, 1 October 1984 – 18 January 1991

Stations
 Dale Mabry Field, Florida, 22 Ju1y 1942
 Perry Army Air Field, Florida, 13 Jun 1943 – 1 May 1944
 Luke Air Force Base, Arizona, 1 October 1984 – 18 January 1991

Aircraft
 Bell P-39 Airacobra, 1942–1943
 Republic P-47 Thunderbolt, 1943–1944
 Curtiss P-40 Warhawk, 1944
 General Dynamics F-16C/D Fighting Falcon, 1984–1991

See also

References

Notes

Bibliography

 
 
 
 
 
 

Fighter squadrons of the United States Air Force
Military units and formations established in 1984